is a Japanese politician. He was a former leader of the Democratic Party for the People (DPP) and the Democratic Party (DP). A native of Nagoya, Aichi, he attended Waseda University and received a Ph.D. in fiscal and monetary policies and reforms. Afterwards, he worked at the Bank of Japan from 1983 to 2000 before being elected to the House of Councillors for the first time in 2001.

Democratic Party leadership
After the 2017 general election, then-DP president Seiji Maehara faced intense criticism for his decision to disband the DP caucus in the Lower House and forcing DP members to seek re-election as members of Kibō no Tō, the CDP or as independents. As a result, Maehara resigned as DP president on 30 October 2017. Otsuka was elected unopposed to succeed Maehara the following day.

In May 2018, Otsuka led the DP to merge with Kibō no Tō, forming the DPFP. Otsuka became the co-leader of the new party, along with Kibō leader Yuichiro Tamaki. He chose not to run for a full 3-year term in the DPP leadership election in September 2018.

References 

Members of the House of Councillors (Japan)
Waseda University alumni
Living people
1959 births
People from Nagoya
Democratic Party of Japan politicians